Michael Apokapes (also known as Abu K’ab or Aboukab) was doux of Edessa under the Byzantine Emperor Michael IV the Paphlagonian (r. 1034–1041). A member of the Apokapes family, he was the father of Basil Apokapes. Michael Apokapes was served by Eustathios Boilas for fifteen years.

Sources
 
 
 

11th-century deaths
11th-century Byzantine people